The Fulton Farm, also known as "River Bend Farm," is a historic farmstead in Shelby County, Ohio, United States. Built primarily in 1848, the distinctively Gothic Revival farm buildings are a leading element of Shelby County rural architecture; few pre-Civil War farmhouses elsewhere in the county are more elaborate. Besides the farmhouse, the complex includes four less important buildings, two brick and two wooden: a smokehouse, a carriage house, and two smaller barns.

Prominent farmer Isaac Fulton built the one-and-one-half story farmhouse and other buildings for his wife, the former Jane Taylor, soon after their 1848 wedding. The construction, which was not finished until 1850, was almost entirely Fulton's work; he even made the bricks by himself. Fulton used an unusual floor plan; the house's footprint is asymmetrical, and its windows are a mix of trabeated and traditional Gothic Revival styles.

In 1979, the Fulton Farm was listed on the National Register of Historic Places.  It qualified for inclusion on the Register because of its impact on two different areas of local history: its well-preserved historic architecture and its place in the development of agriculture in central Shelby County.

References

Houses completed in 1848
Farms on the National Register of Historic Places in Ohio
Gothic Revival architecture in Ohio
Houses on the National Register of Historic Places in Ohio
Sidney, Ohio
Houses in Shelby County, Ohio
National Register of Historic Places in Shelby County, Ohio